The 1987 NBL Finals was the championship series of the 1987 season of Australia's National Basketball League (NBL) and the conclusion of the season's playoffs. The Brisbane Bullets defeated the Perth Wildcats in two games (2-0) for their second NBL championship.

Format
The 1987 National Basketball League Finals started on 30 September and concluded on 16 October. The playoffs consisted of two best of three Semi-finals and the best of three game Grand Final series.

Qualification

Qualified teams

Ladder

The NBL tie-breaker system as outlined in the NBL Rules and Regulations states that in the case of an identical win–loss record, the results in games played between the teams will determine order of seeding.

Elimination-Finals

Semi-finals

(2) Brisbane Bullets vs (3) Illawarra Hawks

Game 1

Game 2

Game 3

(1) Adelaide 36ers vs (4) Perth Wildcats

Game 1

Game 2

Game 3

Grand Final series

(2) Brisbane Bullets vs (4) Perth Wildcats

Game 1

Game 2

See also
 1987 NBL season

References

Finals
National Basketball League (Australia) Finals